Coca-Cola Telecommunications (CCT) was a short-lived first-run syndication unit of Columbia Pictures Television (then a unit of The Coca-Cola Company) created on November 24, 1986, that was a merger between CPT's first-run syndication division and The Television Program Source. The Television Program Source was a joint-venture between Alan Bennett, former King World president Robert King, and CPT that was founded on October 15, 1984.

History

The company brought on to revive the Screen Gems line, used for obscure and vintage never-before-seen Columbia Pictures Television programming, and assisted in colorization of black-and-white television shows, the 1950s programs The Real McCoys and The Life and Legend of Wyatt Earp, and bought a minority interest in Color Systems Technology.

In 1987, Coca-Cola acquired assets of The Television Program Source outright, which included the assets, program and personnel, and Bob King would be president of the Coca-Cola Telecommunications division, and the company was responsible for the production and distribution of programming first-run syndication, basic cable and pay TV, home video and home shopping. Also that year, Coca-Cola Telecommunications and colorizing company CST Entertainment had set up a joint venture, Screen Gems/CST Entertainment, in order to share profits from sales to TV, basic cable and home video, in order to distribute the libraries of vintage films and TV series.

Following on from the success of the program The New Gidget, Coca-Cola Telecommunications took them to do pilots for weekly series, one based on the Ben Casey character, and partnered with Tribune Entertainment on two projects such as Gunfighter, which was produced by Sonny Grosso and Larry Jacobson of Grosso-Jacobson Productions, which was pitched for the Tribune Broadcasting stations, and one with DIC Entertainment on a 90-minute block of three-animated half-hour programs, which went by two different names, Funday Sunday, if it run on Sunday, or Funtastic Saturday, if they want to go head to head with the kidvid blocks on Saturday mornings.

In March 1987, a new company partnered with Paramount Domestic Television had set up International Advertising Sales to held the barter spots for all programs that were produced by Coca-Cola Telecommunications, which included futures from Merv Griffin Enterprises, and Paramount Domestic Television, and Orbis Communications is going to be the third part of the venture, in order to sell national ad time for the company, and sell not only Coke and Paramount's barter sales but its own.

In late March 1987, Screen Gems/CST Entertainment was renamed to Screen Gems Classicolor, with the CST venture available was in excess of $100 million, and feature Color Systems' library of 101 feature films and a catalog of TV series, which included The Abbott & Costello Show, and Color Systems Technology was paid by Screen Gems to colorize the B&W titles from the joint venture library, and Screen Gems Classicolor's revenue was paid from distribution of the combined Screen Gems and CST libraries in the short-term, and color-converted versions of the titles would go into the pipeline by 1988, and plans to acquire additional features and TV shows for distribution and color conversion, and input many series from the Columbia Pictures Television library that was available for colorization use, which included library series, as well as feature films that were originally released in the black-and-white format.

In May 1987, Coca-Cola Telecommunications partnered with Grosso-Jacobson Productions in order to make the development of productions in a non-exclusive pact, namely four made-for-television movies, which included The Gunfighters, Hounds of Hell, Nightfighters and Partington, which was offered to first-run syndication. In June 1987, Coca-Cola Telecommunications and HBO signed an agreement to co-produce and distribute 15 made-for-cable films that was licensed for a foreign release, and commit as much as $70 million to the venture, and wants HBO to produce the projects in-house, or by third-party producers under the HBO Pictures banner, and five of them were produced by Coca-Cola Telecommunications, and production costs were shared on all films, and under the terms of the deal, HBO would premiere the films and retain the domestic home video rights to the ten films, while CCT received domestic home video rights to the five films, as well as foreign rights of all 15 films in the agreement.

On December 31, 1987, CCT was shut down and was folded into the reorganized Columbia Pictures Television Distribution (now Sony Pictures Television). This change came when Columbia/Embassy Television was merged with Tri-Star Television, resulting in the loss of two key executives who had run CCT, namely Herman Rush and Peter Seale, as well as Columbia/Embassy Television president Barbara Corday. As a result, CCT had merged with the distribution division of Columbia/Embassy Television to start out Columbia Pictures Television Distribution, featuring most of the original Columbia/Embassy distribution team, who had survived after the merger, including syndicated president Barry Thurston, who had headed Columbia/Embassy's syndication business and took over all of the responsibilities for CCT. Shortly after Coca-Cola Telecommunications shut down, two of the company's top executives, namely Herman Rush and Peter Seale had to launch a brand new company in order to allow them and other executives of the CCT unit to form a new company that would be a successor of CCT to distribute certain of the unit's properties that was formerly handled by Coca-Cola Telecommunications and has still had negotiations to start a brand new syndicated company.

Notable programs

TV series
Hardcastle and McCormick (1983-1986; A Stephen J. Cannell Production; originally distributed by Colex Enterprises)
Punky Brewster (1984-1988, produced by Lightkeeper Productions in association with NBC Productions; syndicated from 1987 to 1988, Sony Pictures Television handles domestic syndication, while NBCUniversal Television Distribution owns the show and handles international syndication with MGM Television also handles International syndicated TV distribution. Shout! Factory has DVD rights under license from NBC)
The Price Is Right (1985-1986; A Mark Goodson Production; nighttime version as TPS now owned by Fremantle North America)
Card Sharks (1986-1987; A Mark Goodson Production; nighttime version as TPS now owned by Fremantle North America)
The New Gidget (1986-1988)
The Real Ghostbusters (1987-1988 only, co-produced by DIC Enterprises)
Dinosaucers (1987, produced by DIC Enterprises)
Hulk Hogan's Rock 'N' Wrestling (1985 special episode only) (produced by DIC Enterprises, owned by WWE)
Merv Griffin at the Coconut Ballroom (1987 pilot)
New Monkees (1987)
Sylvanian Families (1987) (produced by DIC Enterprises, now owned by WildBrain)
That's My Mama Now (1987 pilot)
What's Happening Now!! (1987-1988 only, distributed by LBS Communications Inc.)
Starcom: The U.S. Space Force (1987) (produced by DIC Enterprises, now owned by WildBrain)

Attempted series
A revival of Now You See It, to be hosted by new host Jack Clark was also planned, but never made it past the pilot stage.
A revival of Match Game, to be hosted by original host Gene Rayburn was also planned, but never materialized.

TV specials
Dennis the Menace: Dinosaur Hunter (1987) (co-produced by DIC Enterprises, distributed by LBS Communications Inc., now owned by Sony Pictures Television)
Meet Julie (1987)

Notes and references

Mass media companies established in 1986
Mass media companies disestablished in 1988
Telecommunications
Sony Pictures Television
Sony Pictures Entertainment
Television syndication distributors
American companies established in 1986
American companies disestablished in 1988